"Talk of the Town" is a song written and sung by Jack Johnson released as the second single from the album Sing-A-Longs and Lullabies for the Film Curious George.

It was the follow-up single to the worldwide hit "Upside Down". It peaked at the Dutch Singles Chart at #96. Johnson performed the song with Kawika Kahiapo.

Track listing

CD single
 "Talk of the Town"
 "Fall Line" (live, with Matt Costa)

Charts

External links
 Talk of the Town Lyrics

2006 singles
Jack Johnson (musician) songs
Songs written by Jack Johnson (musician)
Rock ballads
2006 songs
Universal Records singles